Boris Petrović (Serbian Cyrillic: Борис Петровић; born 28 January 1987) is a Serbian singer from Žitište. He became famous during 2nd season of The First Voice of Serbia.

Career

Prvi glas Srbije: 2012–present
In 2012, Petrović participated in second season of The First Voice of Serbia. He ended up on 5th place. During the show finals, Boris sang following songs:
1st Night: Toni Cetinski - Onaj ko te ljubi sretan je
2nd Night: Zdravko Čolić - Pusti, pusti modu
3rd Night: Zvonko Bogdan - Čamac na Tisi
4th Night: Crvena Jabuka - Tugo, nesrećo
5th Night: Joe Cocker - You Can Leave Your Hat On
6th Night: Bon Jovi - It's my Life
7th Night: Indexi - Bacila je sve niz reku / Survivor - Eye of the Tiger
8th Night: Bryan Adams - Everything I do, I do it for you / Boža Nikolić - Lažem sebe da mogu bez tebe
9th Night: Saša Kovačević - Lapsus / James Brown - I Got You (I Feel Good) / Generacija 5 - Povedi me u noć
During this contest, Boris became very popular. Everybody recognize him as "songful gas jockey", because he is working on Gas Station in Žitište.

References

1987 births
Living people
21st-century Serbian male singers